Jakers! The Adventures of Piggley Winks (or simply Jakers in Europe) is a computer-animated children's television series. The series was broadcast on PBS Kids in the United States, and on CBBC and CBeebies in the United Kingdom. It was also broadcast in Australia on ABC Kids. The series ran for three seasons and 52 episodes total from September 7, 2003, to January 24, 2007, with reruns airing through August 31, 2008. Reruns aired on the Qubo television network from June 30, 2012 (alongside Taste Buds, Artzooka! and Harry and His Bucket Full of Dinosaurs) to March 26, 2017.

The show chronicles the boyhood adventures of Piggley Winks, an anthropomorphic pig from Ireland, and how he relates these stories to his grandchildren as a grandfather in the modern day. Many of the stories takes place on the Winks family's farm, Raloo Farm, located in the village of Tara. The word "jakers" was originally a euphemism for "Jesus" in much of Ireland during the 1950s and 1960s, and was an exclamation of surprise, delight, dismay, or alarm. Piggley and his father exclusively use it to express their delight when they discover something on their adventures. Notably, the show contains voiceover work by the actors Joan Rivers and Mel Brooks.

Plot
Jakers!  takes place in two different settings, in two different time periods.

In the present time (the frame story), Piggley Winks lives in the United States (or Great Britain, according to different versions) and tells stories of his childhood in a rural area in the south of Ireland to his three grandchildren. In flashbacks, he is seen as a child, playing with his friends and going to school in rural Ireland in the mid-1950s. Most of the main characters are anthropomorphic animals—including Piggley and his family, who are all pigs. However, there are normal, non-anthropomorphic animals in the show as well.

Past
Piggley Winks lived with his parents Pádraig and Elly and his younger sister Molly at Raloo Farm in Ireland during the 1950s. His best friends are Dannan O'Mallard, a duck who lives in a hut by a pond with her rarely seen grandmother, and Fernando "Ferny" Toro, a young bull who lives with his widowed father, the Spanish blacksmith Don Toro in the village of Tara. Piggley's rival is the main antagonist, Hector McBadger.

Piggley lives his everyday life on the farm as a normal child, going to school, helping his parents, taking care of his sister, and having adventures, almost always followed by his friends. He has always been interested in stories and legends, and his fertile mind and mischievous spirit put him in many unpredictable situations, like believing fairies turned Ferny into a bug, trying to hatch a supposed dragon's egg, using the Salmon of Knowledge to pass the school exam, and even trying to capture the legendary Fir Darrig.

Each story also features a subplot featuring a sheep named Wiley (voiced by Mel Brooks), who lives at Raloo Farm with his flock. As the only sheep in the flock who can talk, he believes he is their natural leader, and tries to get the other sheep to do all kinds of different things (singing, racing, playing sports, acting, etc.), with varying degrees of success. He is later assisted by his mate, a female sheep named Shirley (in earlier seasons, Shirley had no lines; also, in the episode "Growing Pains" gave birth to a lamb, later named Little Baa).

A running gag on the show is that Wiley's subplot and Piggley's plot would collide (e.g. in "Sheep on the Loose", Wiley runs away and Piggley, as the shepherd, tries to find him).

CommonSenseMedia explains that at the end of each episode there is a live-action segment, in which "group of children talk about their own experiences and feelings, reflecting on what the episode has been about".

Present
An elderly Piggley lives with his daughter Ciara and her three children, the twins Seán and Séamus, and their older sister Meg. Whenever the children have an issue, Piggley tells them one of his childhood stories as a moral lesson. The grandchildren are able to identify exaggerations in his stories.

The original American accents of Ciara and her children have been dubbed with English accents for broadcast in the United Kingdom.

Episodes

Cast

Main
 Peadar Lamb as Grandpa Piggley Winks
 Maile Flanagan as Young Piggley Winks and Fergal O'Hopper
 Russi Taylor as Fernando (Ferny) Toro, Elly Winks (Piggley and Molly's mother), and Ciara (Piggley's daughter)
 Tara Strong as Dannan O'Mallard, Molly Winks 
 Nika Futterman as Seamus and Sean (Ciara's twin sons)
 Melissa Disney as Meg (Ciara's daughter)
 Mel Brooks as Wiley the Sheep
 Joan Rivers as Shirley the Sheep (Season 3 only)
 Charlie Adler as Mr. Hornsby, Pádraig Winks (Piggley and Molly's father)
 Neil Ross as Mr. McGandry, Mr. O'Hopper (Fergal's Father) 
 Pamela Adlon as Hector McBadger
 Fernando Escandon as Don Toro
 Kath Soucie as Millie, Katrina, Lizzie, and Sharon
 Thom Adcox-Hernandez as Fergal O'Hopper ("Good Neighbor" and "New Best Friends" only)
 Candi Milo as Gosford
 Susan Silo as Miss Nanny
 Mauri Bernstein as Holly
 Fionnula Flanagan as Grandma O'Mallard  
 Jessica DiCicco as Gaddie O'Mallard
 Cathal Nugent as Angry Old Goat
 David Kelly as Captain Cumara
 Brendan Gleeson as Uncle Fernando "Ferny" Toro
 Peter Anderson as Finbarr Hornsby

Additional voices
 Charlie Adler
 Charlie Schlatter
 Jennifer Hale
 Jess Harnell
 Kath Soucie
 Katie Leigh
 Neil Ross

Animals

Farm

Finnegan the Donkey
Sweets the Fawn
The Cow
The Chickens
The Chicks
The Rooster
The Horse (He only appears in "A Touch of Spain".)
The Sheep Flock
Little Baa the lamb

The Wild

Swans (they only appear in the episode "Our Dragon's Egg".)
Deer
The Angry Old Goat

UK cast
Angeline Ball
Gerard Ban Lavery
Connor Byrne
Julie-Ann Dean
Tracy Keating
Aoife McMahon
Joanna Ruiz

Development 
Jakers! was originally conceived by Denise Fitzpatrick based on her experiences on a farm as a young girl in rural Ireland. The original name for her character and the show she planned to adapt him to was originally titled Piggley Pooh, which caused a cease and desist letter by The Walt Disney Company due to the planned show sharing the same name as the Winnie the Pooh series. Despite countersuing and having the European Court side with the Fitzpatrick's, their lawyer decided that changing the name of the show and character would be better to avoid future copyright issues. Eventually, this led to Piggley Pooh becoming Piggley Winks.

After the name change, production on the show began in March 2002, under the title of The Curley Tales of Piggley Winks. Denise's husband, Frances, helped produce the show through his company, Entara, 
while the show was executively produced by Mike Young and animated by his studio Mike Young Productions, which at the time was handling international distribution for the series. Notably, the show was rendered in high definition, being the first cartoon to do so at the time.

Broadcast 
Jakers! The Adventures of Piggley Winks was shown on CBeebies and CBBC in United Kingdom from 2004 up until early 2011. It first aired in the United Kingdom on the CBBC Channel on September 6, 2004, as part of the short lived Animadness block, and later was repeated on CBeebies from February 13, 2006, on the BBC One strand at 3:25pm, but it didn't air on the CBeebies Channel until March 19, 2007, when the scheduling of CBeebies was changing, and Qubo, and PBS Kids, and PBS Kids Sprout in United States.

9 Story Media Group currently distributes the series.

Reruns on PBS Kids continued to air until August 31, 2008. However, PBS Kids Sprout aired this series in 2005, but was taken off after July 3, 2008.

Univision's Planeta U carried the show as part of the block's inaugural lineup from its launch on April 5, 2008, to August 28, 2010.

DVD releases

US releases

UK releases

Reception

Critical response
CommonSenseMedia gave the show a rating of 4 stars out of 5, commenting "The animation is lovely, the characters are amusing and cute, and the lessons are so gently presented that it really is a pleasure to learn them."

Awards
 Humanitas Award Children's Animation Category for "The Gift", written by Sindy McKay-Swerdlove, Dennis Haley & Marcy Brown (2007)
 Humanitas Award in the Children's Animation Category for "Waking Thor" Written by Kelly Ward and Cliff McGillivray (2005)
 Emmy Award for Outstanding Children's Animated Program (2006)
 Emmy Award for Outstanding Performer in an Animated Program – Maile Flanagan (2006)
 Emmy Award for Outstanding Music Direction & Composition (2005)
 Emmy Award for Outstanding Individual in Animation – Milk Melodrama (2005)
 Emmy Award for Outstanding Individual in Animation – Production Designer (2004)
 Emmy Award for Outstanding Individual in Animation – Storyboard Artist: All Night Long (2004)
 British Academy Children's Award for Best International (2005)
 Chicago International Film Festival Gold Hugo Award in the Animated Series Category (2005)
 Chicago International Film Festival Silver Hugo Award in the Animated Series Category (2004)
 Webby Award for PBS/Jakers! Website (2005)
 Parents' Choice Silver Honor Award in the Television Category (2004 & 2006)
 Genesis Commendation Award from the Humane Society of the United States (2004)
 New York Festivals Gold World Medal Award in the Animation Category for Youth/Young Adult Programs (2006)
 Prix Jeunesse Web Prize Winner (2004)

References

External links
 
 Official Site
 

2000s American animated television series
2003 American television series debuts
2007 American television series endings
2000s British animated television series
2003 British television series debuts
2007 British television series endings
American children's animated adventure television series
American children's animated comedy television series
American computer-animated television series
American preschool education television series
American television series with live action and animation
British children's animated adventure television series
British children's animated comedy television series
British computer-animated television series
British preschool education television series
British television series with live action and animation
Irish children's animated adventure television series
Irish children's animated comedy television series
Irish preschool education television series
Television series set in the 1950s
Television series set in the 21st century
Television shows set in the Republic of Ireland
Animated television series about children
Animated television series about pigs
BBC children's television shows
PBS original programming
Television series by 9 Story Media Group
Television series by Splash Entertainment
English-language television shows
Daytime Emmy Award for Outstanding Animated Program winners
PBS Kids shows
The Den (TV programme)
2003 Irish television series debuts
2007 Irish television series endings
CBeebies
Animated preschool education television series
2000s preschool education television series
Television series about pigs
Television shows set on farms